WPC 56 is a British television police procedural series, created and partly written by Dominique Moloney and broadcast on BBC One. The stories feature the first woman police constables (WPC) to join the fictional Midlands Constabulary at Brinford Police Station in 1956. Series one and two focus on Gina Dawson (Jennie Jacques) as she struggles to gain acceptance at a male-dominated police station and having to deal with the sexist attitudes that were commonplace at that time.

The third series depicts the experiences of her successor at the station, Annie Taylor (Claudia Jessie). Each series is a set of five episodes and broadcast on five consecutive afternoons, initially during March 2013, February 2014 and March 2015.

Synopses

Series 1
WPC 56 Gina Dawson lives at home with her parents, Joe and Brenda, in Brinford near Birmingham. This story set in 1956, revolves around the finding of the skeleton of a boy, a serial attacker of women and delving into the historical case of two missing boys. Dawson is appointed to be the first female police officer in Brinford police station where Chief Inspector Nelson gives her a small office, previously a storage room. She is told to stick to making tea, doing paperwork, dealing with children and women. She is told not to distract the men, who might seek to protect her in dangerous situations; they can deal with the important police work. She finds it hard to be taken seriously by her male colleagues and is shocked by the methods employed by Sergeant Fenton and the attitude of the rest of her fellow officers. She has a boyfriend, Frank Marshall.

Series 2
The second series revolves around a councillor's dead body and his missing girlfriend Rebecca Jones. Detective Inspector Jack Burns leaves the police to look after his sick wife and his daughters. He is replaced by a Londoner, Detective Inspector Max Harper. Chief Inspector Nelson and desk Sergeant Pratt are replaced by Briggs and Swift. Police Constable Eddie Coulson is on honeymoon with Cathy Sinclair. His father, Chief Superintendent Coulson, has sexual designs on WPC Dawson. Sergeant Fenton has a daughter and is on friendly terms with the local brothel madam, Rosie Turner, and the crooked boxing promoter Lenny Powell. Cathy Sinclair is replaced by Susie Nightingale as the station secretary.

Series 3
The third series revolves round the shooting of a retired brigadier and events at a secure hospital and the relationships of Chief Inspector Briggs, his wife Charlotte, homosexual Carl Saunders and Coulson's desire to take control of the station and undermine those that know of his past misdemeanours.
WPC Gina Dawson, having been cleared of all blame in a shooting, moves to the Metropolitan Police. Coulson reneges on his promise to Chief Inspector Briggs that he will retire early after sexually molesting Dawson, and has been promoted to Assistant Chief Constable. WPC Annie Taylor, whose father is a retired Brinford police sergeant, replaces Dawson. She lives with her parents and knows how to handle her fellow officers. Sergeant Fenton returns to duty, after being shot, his confidence dented; which he tries to regain using Constable Perkins. Detective Inspector Harry Sawyer, a Jewish officer who is estranged from his mother, replaces DI Max Harper.

Cast

Main
 Jennie Jacques as WPC Gina Dawson (series 1–2)
 Claudia Jessie as WPC Annie Taylor (series 3)
 Charlie De'Ath as Sergeant Sidney Fenton
 John Bowler as Chief Superintendent (later Asst Chief Constable) Arthur Coulson
 Kieran Bew as DI Jack Burns (series 1–2)
 Ben Turner as DI Max Harper (series 2)
 Oliver Rix as DI Harry Sawyer (series 3)
 John Light as Chief Inspector Roger Nelson (series 1)
 Mark Healy as Chief Inspector Walter Briggs (series 2–3)
 Gerard Horan as Sergeant Peter Pratt (series 1)
 James Barriscale as Sergeant John Swift (series 2–3)
 Chris Overton as PC Eddie Coulson (series 1)
 Liam Jeavons as PC Tommy Perkins (series 2–3)
 Rachel Leskovac as Susie Nightingale (series 2–3)
 Daniel Brocklebank as Carl Saunders (series 2–3)

Supporting
 Tim Plester as Linus Brody (series 1–2)
 Martha Howe-Douglas as Abigail Fenton (series 1–2)
 Justine Michelle Cain as Cathy Sinclair (series 1)
 Philip Hill-Pearson as Frank Marshall (series 1)
 Marianne Oldham as Deborah Burns (series 1)
 Tom McLarney as Sam Pratt (series 1)
 Jonty Stephens as Joe Dawson (series 1)
 Kathryn Hunt as Brenda Dawson (series 1)
 Jessica Duncan as Rebecca Jones (series 2)
 Chris Wilson as Tom (series 1- 3)
 Michael Higgs as Lenny Powell (series 2)
 Danny Szam as Chris Hutton (series 2)
 Patricia Potter as Charlotte Briggs (series 3)
 John Duttine as Douglas Taylor (series 3)
 Melanie Kilburn as Lydia Taylor (series 3)
 Matt Kennard as David Meyer (series 3)

Episodes

Series 1 (2013)

Series 2 (2014)

Series 3 (2015)

Filming
WPC 56 is a BBC Birmingham production filmed in and around Birmingham using period locations, including the Jewellery Quarter and the Black Country Living Museum. The exterior of the police station is the Birmingham and Midland Institute on Margaret Street. The interiors are in a disused building on Vittoria Street.

International broadcasts
 Ireland, the programme is broadcast on RTÉ One
 Finland, the programme is broadcast on Yle TV1
 Russia, the programme is broadcast on TV Tsentr
 United States, the programme stream on Amazon Prime

References

External links 

Fiction set in 1956
2013 British television series debuts
2015 British television series endings
2010s British police procedural television series
English-language television shows
Television series set in the 1950s
Television shows set in Birmingham, West Midlands
BBC Daytime television series
Works about sexism